"On Leather Wings" is the first episode of Batman: The Animated Series. It originally aired on the Fox network in the United States on September 6, 1992. It was written by Mitch Brian and directed by Kevin Altieri. This was the first episode of the series to feature the villain Man-Bat, and was also Man-Bat's first screen appearance. In comics, Man-Bat first appeared in 1970. Although "On Leather Wings" was the first episode of the series to be produced, it was the second to be broadcast, following "The Cat and the Claw, Part 1", which premiered just the day before.

Plot
When something resembling a giant bat is seen in the skies over Gotham City, and later attacks a guard at Phoenix Pharmaceuticals, Batman is considered the culprit. Detective Harvey Bullock asks Mayor Hamilton Hill for permission to form a tactical squad to capture Batman, which was denied by Commissioner Gordon, who does not believe Batman is responsible. Hill authorizes the strike force with District Attorney Harvey Dent promising to put Batman in jail if Bullock catches him.

Believing he was set up, Batman investigates and finds out there were two similar robberies at other pharmaceutical companies. Batman infiltrates Phoenix Pharmaceuticals, unknowingly alerting the security guards, who call the police. As he investigates Bullock's strike force arrive at the scene, just as Gordon tells him another pharmaceutical company was just robbed across town, proving Batman's innocence. Batman escapes the squad with the only recovered clues: a recording of the guard's attack and a fur sample.

The next day, Bruce Wayne visits the Gotham Zoo to ask bat expert Dr. March about the mysterious fur and recording, but he is reluctant to help. March's daughter and assistant, Francine, and her husband, Dr. Kirk Langstrom, promise Bruce to analyze them both for him.
Later March calls to give results of the analysis: the sound is a combination of starlings and brown bats, where the fur sample is also from. When the Batcomputer rules both creatures out, Batman becomes suspicious and heads to the zoo to further investigate. There he finds Kirk Langstrom working late, he confesses to stealing the chemicals in order to complete a formula that can transform him into a new species, something neither man nor bat.

Kirk transforms into a giant bat-like creature, known as the Man-Bat, horrifying both Batman and Francine. Man-Bat escapes the zoo but Batman grapples on to him and the two engage in a fierce struggle over Gotham. Batman eventually overpowers Man-Bat and takes him back to the Batcave, where he creates a chemical to reverse the effects of Kirk's serum. Batman returns to the zoo with the restored Kirk to Francine, who is told by Batman the chemical is out of his system but the Man-Bat may not truly be gone.

Cast

Production
Bruce Timm states he wanted this series to focus on "mystery, mood, drama as well as super hero action sequences" and that Man-Bat fit into those categories perfectly. In an interview, he says, "Man-Bat was chosen specifically [for the first episode] because he wasn't familiar to very many people outside of comic book fans. Nobody had any preconceived notions about him. It wasn't like the Joker, where you had to deal with people expecting him to be Jack Nicholson or Cesar Romero."

Reception
Lon Grahnke of the Chicago Sun-Times gave the episode two stars, but added that his six-year-old son thought the premiere was "awesome". Jim Bullard of the St. Petersburg Times wrote: "The episode is extremely well-written and drawn — an unusual combination in cartoons. The result is a unique, memorable style".

References

External links 
 

1992 American television episodes
Batman: The Animated Series episodes
American television series premieres
Bats in popular culture